Iordanis Ilioudis (born 26 February 1961) is a Greek weightlifter. He competed in the men's middleweight event at the 1984 Summer Olympics.

He born and hails from Psychiko, Serres.

References

External links
 

1961 births
Living people
Greek male weightlifters
Olympic weightlifters of Greece
Weightlifters at the 1984 Summer Olympics
Place of birth missing (living people)
People from Serres (regional unit)
Sportspeople from Central Macedonia
20th-century Greek people